A constitutional referendum was held in Azerbaijan on 12 November 1995 alongside the first round of parliamentary elections. Voters were asked the question "Do you agree to the adoption of the draft of the first national Constitution of the Azerbaijan Republic presented by the Commission headed by the President of the Azerbaijani Republic Heydar Aliyev, which has prepared the new constitutional draft of the Azerbaijani Republic?" The result was 91.9% in favour, with turnout reported to be 86.1%.

Results

References

1995 referendums
1995 in Azerbaijan
1995
Constitutional referendums in Azerbaijan
Azerbaijan
Azerbaijan